Chuzo Tamotzu (February 19, 1888 – May 18, 1975) was a self-taught painter who lived in New York City before settling in Santa Fe, New Mexico in 1948.

Tamotzu was born in Kagoshima Prefecture, Japan, in 1888. He was educated in political science at Senshu University in Tokyo. Self-taught in sumi-e, he left Japan in 1914 to further his study of art throughout Asia and Europe. Tamotzu moved to the U.S. in 1920 where he befriended several other artists, such as Philip Evergood, Yasuo Kuniyoshi and John Sloan. Tamotzu served on the board of the Society of Independent Artists when Sloan became the society's president. During the Great Depression, Tamotzu worked for the Public Works of Art Project in New York, but was denied participation in the Works Progress Administration because he was not an American citizen.

Tamotzu served in the American military during World War II as a combat sketch artist, and eventually became an American citizen.  In 1947 Tamotzu became a founding member of the New York Artists' Equity Association.

In 1974 Tamotzu converted the studio he had been renting in Santa Fe from John Sloan into his own gallery. 
 
Tamotzu's art is held in the collections of the Metropolitan Museum, Hirshhorn Museum and Sculpture Garden and New Mexico Museum of Art.

Early life 
Chuzo Tamotzu was born in the village of Toguchi on Amami Ōshima island in Japan. He was raised by his father along with his sisters and older brother. After attending middle school, Tamotzu became interested in the oriental and occidental arts, which he pursued with the help of private tutors. He was also an adept dancer, and a skilled musician playing the Shakuhachi, a Japanese flute. At Senshu University in Tokyo he was educated in political economics for two years. In 1914, he decided to leave Japan to study oriental and European arts by traveling to China, Korea, India, Borneo, France, Belgium, England, and Holland, where he got a closer look to the work of the great masters by visiting the museums.

Career 
Tamotzu moved to New York in 1920 to pursue his art career and resided there for twenty one years. He mastered the art techniques of Japanese Sumi ink, pastel chalk, oils, and tempura. Tamotzu continued his studies and began to gain reputation. He exhibited his work in Whitney Museum of American Art, the Pennsylvania Academy of Fine Arts, The Art Institute of Chicago, the Society of Independent Artists, and The American Contemporary Artists' Gallery.

In 1953, he organized an exchange art presentation between a gathering of New Mexico primary school kids and Hiroshima school children to promote altruism and a better understanding between these countries.

From 1950 to 1959 The Museum of New Mexico held annual exhibitions of his art.

As a member of Artists' Equity Association, he contributed into passing a legislation for the formation of the New Mexico Arts Commission.

Personal life 
In 1948, Tamotzu married Louise Kates and moved to Santa Fe, New Mexico. He continued working on his art, participating in exhibitions and giving demonstrations and talks in schools. He was also a member of the Alliance for the Arts.

In 1967, he returned to Japan and visit his family, which led to the creation of sixty sketches of Japan and a number of paintings.

In 1974, his studio was converted into the Tamotzu Gallery, where he continued exhibiting his art.

References

Artists from Santa Fe, New Mexico
1888 births
1975 deaths
20th-century American painters
Public Works of Art Project artists
People from the Amami Islands
Japanese emigrants to the United States
American military personnel of Japanese descent
American artists of Japanese descent
Society of Independent Artists
Federal Art Project artists